A still image film, also called a picture movie, is a film that consists primarily or entirely of still images rather than moving images, forgoing the illusion of motion either for aesthetic or practical reasons. These films usually include a standard soundtrack, similar to what is found in typical sound films, complete with music, sound effects, dialogue or narration. They may also use various editing techniques found in traditional films, such as dissolves, zooms, and panning.

History
This filmmaking technique is more common in historical documentaries, where old photographs may provide the best documentation of certain events. Ken Burns is well known for having used it repeatedly in his films. It is less common in narrative films, but has been done occasionally. Such films are typically considered experimental or art films. Perhaps the best known narrative still image film is Chris Marker's 1962 film La Jetée, which was the inspiration for the 1995 film 12 Monkeys.

In narrative filmmaking, the vast majority of still image films are short films. Many student films are still image films, and the making of these films is a requirement in some film school courses. George Lucas's first film, the short Look at Life, was made up of only still images heavily influenced by films from Arthur Lipsett like his Oscar-nominated Very Nice, Very Nice. Robert Downey Sr.'s 1966 feature film Chafed Elbows is constructed primarily from still photographs, with a few live-action sequences. Additionally, the 2007 Mexican film Year of the Nail is made up entirely of photographs taken by the director, Jonás Cuarón, over the course of one year. It is perhaps the only feature-length narrative film consisting exclusively of still images. However, many narrative films still employ this technique for individual scenes. Some notable examples are John Cassavetes's Husbands (1970), Gordon Parks Jr.'s Super Fly (1972), Alan J. Pakula's The Parallax View (1974), Tom Tykwer's Run Lola Run (1998), and Apichatpong Weerasethakul's Uncle Boonmee Who Can Recall His Past Lives (2010).

In a 1961 letter to the New York Times, photographer-filmmaker Louis Clyde Stoumen surveyed earlier uses of the technique by himself and others:

“Curt Oertel made his ‘Michaelangelo,’ with important storytelling use of still material, in 1940 (released as Robert Flaherty’s ‘The Titan’ around 1949). Belgium’s Henri Starc began imparting dramatic film form to still images in 1936, and his lyric ‘World of Paul Delvaux’ (1947) is an acknowledged classic. Paul Haesaerts made ‘Rubens’ in 1948. Americans Paul Falkenberg and Lewis Jacobs made ‘Lincoln Speaks at Gettysburg’ entirely out of nineteenth-century engravings, 1950. Ben Berg and Herbert Block of Hollywood have for years been making a series of story-telling dramas out of paintings and prints, including a life story of Goya. I myself pioneered the dramatic use of still photographs (rather than paintings or prints) in a story-telling sequence for Arch Oboler’s 1950 Columbia feature ‘Five,’ and have for more than a decade continued development of this form--in my independent feature ‘The Naked Eye’ (1956), the featurette ‘The True Story of the Civil War’ (an Academy Award winner, 1956), Warner Brothers’ ‘The James Dean Story’ (1957), and most recently...for...ABC-TV’s ‘Winston Churchill, the Valiant Years.”

Style
Filmmakers working with still images may do so out of necessity, such as when resources are limited and they are only able to shoot still photographs, rather than moving pictures. However, it is also sometimes chosen for stylistic reasons, and can allow the filmmakers to do things that would be impossible with traditional moving pictures. In Chafed Elbows, for example, the filmmakers had the freedom to improvise their lines during post-production. Additionally, the use of still images made possible a scene in which one character appears to throw another out of a high window, while the actors remained safe. Additionally, in Year of the Nail, the director pieced together unstaged photographs from his real life and was able to build a fictional story from these. Furthermore, still image films may decrease the filmmakers' limitations, as dialogue and sound effects need not be synchronized with moving images.

Burns has credited documentary filmmaker Jerome Liebling for teaching him how still photographs could be incorporated into documentary films. He has also cited the 1957 National Film Board of Canada documentary City of Gold, co-directed by Colin Low and Wolf Koenig, as a prior example of the technique. Winner of the Prix du Documentaire at the Cannes Film Festival and nominated for an Academy Award, City of Gold used animation camera techniques to slowly pan and zoom across archival still pictures of Canada's Klondike Gold Rush.

Perception
As most audiences are unaccustomed to still image films, many viewers are initially turned off by them, but one study has shown that people adjust to the style after about seven minutes, as long as the story is engaging. There is some debate about whether or not still image films should in fact be considered as genuine motion pictures, since they do not in fact employ the illusion of motion, with some considering them more akin to the slideshow.

The term photomontage has also been used to describe still image films, although that word actually refers to something else entirely.

Notable Examples 
 City of Gold (1957)
 Very Nice, Very Nice (1961)
 La Jetée (1962)
 Salut les cubains (1963)
 Look at Life (1965) 
 Chafed Elbows (1966)
One Second in Montreal (1969)
Santa's Christmas Elf (Named Calvin) (1971)
From These Roots (1974)
 Eadweard Muybridge, Zoopraxographer (1975)
 Dog's Dialogue (1977)
 Das Clown (1999)
 Some Photos in the City of Sylvia (2007)
 Year of the Nail (2007)
 The Glass Fortress (2016)

Notable still image filmmakers
Agnes Varda
Arthur Lipsett
Santiago Alvarez
William Greaves
Thom Andersen
Ken Burns
Colin Low
Jonás Cuarón
Robert Downey Sr.
Chris Marker
George Lucas
Michael Snow

See also
Ken Burns effect
One-shot film
Found footage film
Found footage
Collage film
Video essay

References

1940s in film
1950s in film
1960s in film
1970s in film
1990s in film
2000s in film
2010s in film
Documentary film
Experimental film
Cinematic techniques